Eton College Boat Club is a rowing club based on the River Thames, at Eton College, Windsor and at the Eton Rowing Centre on Dorney Lake.

History
The Club belongs to Eton College and was founded in 1840 although there are earlier references to rowing at the college (as early as 1791). In 1818, Eton challenged Westminster to a race and in 1829, a race actually took place. This race was known as 'The Challenge'. This race was reinitiated in 2019. The college has a significant record of producing a number of junior national champions and regatta champions and has won the Schools' Head of the River Race a record 14 times, the Queen Mother Challenge Cup at the National Schools' Regatta a record 20 times and the Princess Elizabeth Challenge Cup at the Henley Royal Regatta a record 15 times. Eton has also won the Ladies' Challenge Plate 24 times and the Visitors' Challenge Cup once.

Former pupils known as Old Etonians have their own rowing club called the Eton Vikings Club and include Matthew Pinsent, Constantine Louloudis and Ed Coode.

Honours

British champions

Key= J junior, 2, 4, 8 crew size, 18, 16, 15, 14 age group, x sculls, - coxless, + coxed

National Schools' Regatta

Henley Royal Regatta

Schools' Head of the River Race

References

Sport in Berkshire
Rowing clubs in England
Rowing clubs of the River Thames
Windsor, Berkshire
Scholastic rowing in the United Kingdom